An eyelash curler is a hand-operated mechanical device for curling eyelashes for cosmetic purposes. Usually only the upper eyelashes are curled.

History
There were different patents of this invention between 1923 and 1940. The first known patent for the eyelash curler states that it was filed by Charles Stickel and William McDonell from Rochester, New York. However, William Joseph Beldue was recognized as one of the first inventors while he was working for Kurlash Co., in Rochester, NY. William Beldue and his Kurlash Company held patents in Canada, the United States and Great Britain for the eyelash curler and improvements to it.

In the 1930s and in 1940s, at the top of the makeup fashion, these curlers were very popular and not expensive. The eyelash curler was patented April 7, 1931 and the images drawn in the patent application look very much the same as the eyelash curlers seen on the market today. Originally named Rodal, the brand changed the product’s name to Kurlash.

Eyelash curlers are usually made of metal, and often have rubber pads where the curlers make contact with the lashes. The general design of these devices remains the same from the 1940s. Manufacturers include Shiseido and Shu Uemura.

Types 
The two most common types of eyelash curlers are heated curlers and traditional eyelash curlers. Heated eyelash curlers deliver a more intense curl that lasts longer. However, a simpler step to add to an eye makeup routine includes a more traditional, unheated eyelash curler. An unheated curler that is curved for the natural shape of an individual's eye includes a plentiful enough pad to press against eyelashes. Before using, an unheated curler can be heated for a short time with a hair dryer, but not to the extent to burn the delicate skin above the eyes. Self-heating, battery-operated units are available.

Disadvantages
Among many advantages, there are some disadvantages to the eyelash curler. If not used with care, pulling on the eyelashes while curling can lead to weakening of the roots. Many people can damage their eyelashes by holding down the clamp on their lashes for increased lengths of time, leading to their lashes either being pulled out or falling out due to the stress of continuous clamping. This may result in the eyelashes becoming weak and eventually lead to shedding which can be very bad for an eye because they protect the eye from wind and dust and don’t grow back quickly.

If not used carefully, eyelash curlers can lead to accidents where a user pinches the eyelid. Depending on the amount of pressure they apply, this can cause a serious injury to the eye. Similarly, when used warm, an eyelash curler, especially those made of metal, can cause serious burns to the eyelid. Also, some heated eyelash curlers require batteries to run, which will require maintenance to run in terms of replacement on time for smooth functioning.

See also

 Tweezers
 Fake eyelashes
Mascara

References

Beauty
Human eyelashes